Sevgi Soysal (born Sevgi Yenen; September 30, 1936 – November 22, 1976) was a Turkish writer.

Personal life
She was born in Istanbul on September 30, 1936 as the third child of six to Mithat Yenen, an architect-civil servant, and his German wife Anneliese Rupp , who took later the Turkish name Aliye. After completing high school in Ankara, Soysal studied archaeology at Ankara University, but left without graduating. She obtained her degree in the late 1960s.

In 1956, she married poet and translator Özdemir Nutku. She followed her husband  to Germany, where she attended lectures on archaeology and theatre at the University of Göttingen. She got returned home. In 1958, she gave birth to a son named Korkut.

Between 1960 and 1961 she worked at the Cultural Center of the German Embassy and Ankara Radio. She acted in a solo role in the theatre play Zafer Madalyası (Turkish version of Bad Day at Black Rock) staged at Ankara Meydan Theatre and directed by Haldun Dormen. In 1965, she married Başar Sabuncu, whom she met during her acting on stage.

After the military coup on March 12, 1971, she was accused of belonging to a left-wing organization and put in prison. During her detention in Ankara's Mamak Prison, she met Mümtaz Soysal, a professor of Constitutional law who was also detained for making communist propaganda. They married in the prison. She gave birth to daughter Defna in December 1973 and to daughter Funda in March 1975. Sevgi Soysal was arrested again for political reasons. She spent eight months in prison, and two and half months in exile in Adana.

Sevgi Soysal was diagnosed with breast cancer, and lost one of her breasts in late 1975. She underwent another breast cancer surgery in September 1976, and went with her husband to London for medical treatment. Returning home, she died in Istanbul on November 22, 1976, at age forty. She was laid to rest in the Zincirlikuyu Cemetery, Istanbul.

Writing career
In 1962, she published a collection of short stories, Tutkulu Perçem ("Passionate Bangs"). In the same year, she began to work with the Turkish Radio and Television Corporation (TRT). Her 1970 novel Yürümek ("Walking") received the Turkish Radio and Television Corporation Achievement Award but was banned for obscenity.

She wrote under the pen names:
 Sevgi Nutku while she was married to Özdemir Nutku
 Sevgi Sabuncu while she was married to Başar Sabuncu
 Sevgi Soysal while she was married to Mümtaz Soysal

Selected works 
Her notable works are:
 Tante Rosa, novel (1968)
 Yürümek, novel (1970)
 Yenişehir'de Bir Öğle Vakti (Noontime in Yenişehir), novel (1973), received the Orhan Kemal Award in 1974
 Şafak (Dawn), novel (1975)
 Yıldırım Bölge Kadınlar Koğuşu (Yıldırım Area Women's Ward), memoir (1976)
 Barış Adlı Çocuk (A Child Named Peace), short stories (1976)
 Hoşgeldin Ölüm (Welcome, Death!), unfinished novel

References 

1936 births
1976 deaths
Turkish novelists
Turkish women short story writers
Ankara University alumni
University of Göttingen alumni
Writers from Istanbul
Deaths from cancer in Turkey
Deaths from breast cancer
Turkish people of German descent
Burials at Zincirlikuyu Cemetery
20th-century novelists
20th-century Turkish women writers
20th-century Turkish writers
Turkish socialists
20th-century Turkish short story writers